"Alright" is the second single by the Liverpool Britpop band Cast, fronted by ex La's bassist John Power. The song was the second single taken from their debut album, All Change (1995), and reached number 13 on the UK Singles Chart.

Track listings
Standard
 "Alright"
 "Follow Me Down"
 "Meet Me"

European CD single
 "Alright"
 "Meet Me"

Personnel
Cast
 John Power – vocals, guitar
 Peter Wilkinson – backing vocals, bass
 Liam "Skin" Tyson – guitar
 Keith O'Neill – drums

Production
 John Leckie – producer, mixing

Charts

References

1995 singles
1995 songs
Cast (band) songs
Polydor Records singles
Song recordings produced by John Leckie
Songs written by John Power (musician)